Novak Radonić (Mol, 31 March 1826 – Sremska Kamenica, 11 July 1890) was a painter from modern-day Serbia.

Work
He was the pupil of Petar Pilić and Nikola Aleksić before he went to study art in Vienna. Upon graduation, he went to live and work in Bačka. He completed two iconostases in Sentomas (Srbobran) and Ada in 1863. He was much better as a painter of portraits and historical compositions, for example, the Death of Emperor Uroš and the Death of Prince Marko. 
In addition to religious themes and historical compositions, he also painted portraits in which he reached the highest peaks. His portrait of a boy Dušan Popović is one of the most beautiful and celebrated Serbian portraits from the nineteenth century. As a visual chronicler of Serbian civil society, with an exceptional feeling for the characteristics of the character, he left a whole gallery of portraits of friends and distinguished contemporaries. A special unit of his consists of self-portraits in which he gives a romantic analysis of the subject's own character and mental condition. The encounter with the works of the greats of Italian Renaissance painting conceived doubts in his own artistic possibilities which led him to the final abandonment of painting. He was born in Mol and died in Sremska Kamenica. Radonić, Pavle Simić, and Đura Jakšić were the culmination of Serbian Romanticism.

Gallery

See also
 List of painters from Serbia
 Konstantin Danil
 Nikola Aleksić
 Đura Jakšić
 Katarina Ivanović
 Stevan Todorović

References

External links
 
Serbian Culture/Radonic painting

1826 births
1890 deaths
19th-century Serbian painters
Serbian male painters
Romantic painters
19th-century Serbian male artists